Egidio Guarnacci (born 3 February 1934) is a retired Italian professional footballer who played as a midfielder. 

He played for 11 seasons (183 games, 4 goals) in the Serie A for A.S. Roma and ACF Fiorentina.

After retirement he opened a pharmacy.

Honours
Roma
 Inter-Cities Fairs Cup winner: 1960–61.

Fiorentina
 Coppa Italia winner: 1965–66.
 Mitropa Cup winner: 1965–66.

External links
 

1934 births
Living people
Italian footballers
Italy international footballers
Serie A players
A.S. Roma players
ACF Fiorentina players

Association football midfielders
Colleferro Calcio 1937 players